Kit is usually an abbreviation of the given names Christopher, Katherine, Kathleen, and similar names.

People
People named Kit include:
Kit Ahern (1915–2007), Irish politician
Kit Armstrong (born 1992), American-born pianist and composer
Kit Bond (born 1939), American politician and U.S. Senator from Missouri
Kit Burns (1831–1870), American gang leader
Kit Carson (1809–1868), American frontiersman
Kit Chan (born 1972), Singaporean singer
Kittredge Cherry (born 1957), American author and minister
Kit Coleman (1864–1915), Canadian journalist
Kit Connor (born 2004), English actor
Kit Cope (born 1977), American kickboxer
Kit Culkin (born 1944), American actor
Kit Denton (1928–1997), Australian writer
Kit Fine (born 1946), British philosopher
Kit Harington (born 1986), English actor
Kit Hesketh-Harvey (born 1957), British comedian
Kit Hiller (born 1948), Australian linocut printer and oil painter
Kit Hoover (born 1970), American television reporter
Kit Hung (born 1977), Hong Kong filmmaker
Kit Klein (1910–1985), American speed skater
Kit Lambert (1935–1981), British record producer
Kit Lathrop (born 1956), American National Football League player
Kit Malthouse (born 1966), British Member of Parliament, former Deputy Mayor of London
Christopher "Kit" Marlowe (1564–1593), English playwright
Kit Pearson (born 1947), Canadian writer
Kit Pedler (1927–1981), British television writer
Kit Pongetti (born 1970), American actress
Kit Reed (born 1932), American writer
Kit Symons (born 1971), Wales footballer
Kit Taylor (born 1956), American, COO of New York Magazine
Kit Watkins (born 1953), American jazz musician
Kit West (1936–2016), British special effects artist
Kit Williams (born 1946), British illustrator
Kit Woolsey (born 1943), American bridge and backgammon player
Kit Young (born 1994), British actor

Fictional characters
 Kit, in the books Dark Lord of Derkholm and Year of the Griffin
 Kit, in the film Failure to Launch
 Kit Ballard, protagonist of Blade Kitten
 Kit Bellew, protagonist of Smoke Bellew
 Kit Carruthers, in the film Badlands
 Kit Cloudkicker, in the Disney cartoon TaleSpin
 Kit De Luca, in the film Pretty Woman
 Kit Fisto, Jedi Knight in the Star Wars series
 Christopher "Kit" Julian, in Thomas Hardy's novel The Hand of Ethelberta 
 Kit Keller, in the film A League of Their Own
 Kit Kittredge, in the American Girl doll and book series
 Kit McGraw, in the television series Nip/Tuck
 Kit Nelson, in the TV series Alcatraz
 Kit Oxenford, in Ken Follett's novel Whiteout 
 Kit Porter, in the television series The L Word
 Kit Ramsey, in the film Bowfinger
 Kit Ryan, from the comic series Hellblazer
 Kit Snicket, in the novels A Series of Unfortunate Events
 Kit Tanthalos, in the TV series Willow
 Kit Tyler, in Elizabeth George Speare's novel The Witch of Blackbird Pond (1959) 
 Kit Walker, in the TV series American Horror Story
 Kit Walker, alias of fictional comic book character The Phantom
 Rielle "Kit" Peddler, in the Android: Netrunner universe
 Christopher "Kit" Rodriguez, in the Young Wizards novel series
 Kit Latura, in the film Daylight
 Prince Kit, in the 2015 Disney film Cinderella
 Kit Herondale, in The Dark Artifices trilogy by Cassandra Clare
 Sung Tse-Kit, in the film A Better Tomorrow

See also
 Kit (disambiguation)
 Kitt (disambiguation)
 Kitty (disambiguation)

English-language unisex given names
Lists of people by nickname
Hypocorisms